Arnoglossum floridanum, the Florida cacalia, is a Florida species of plants in the sunflower family.

Arnoglossum floridanum is a plant growing up to 100 cm (40 inches) tall. Flower heads are white or pale green. The species grows in dry sandy ridges and pine-oak forests in central Florida.

References

External links
Atlas of Florida Vascular Plants
Native Florida Wildflowers
Dave's Garden Plant Files
Nature Photography by Shirley Denton

Senecioneae
Endemic flora of Florida
Plants described in 1883
Flora without expected TNC conservation status